is a railway station, jointly operated by Fukui Railway  and the Echizen Railway, located in the city of Fukui, Fukui Prefecture, Japan.

Lines

Station layout
The station consists of one side platform and one island platform connected by a level crossing. The station is staffed.

Platforms

Adjacent stations

History
Tawaramachi Station was opened on April 1, 1937 as a station on the Mikuni Awara Electric Railway. On September 1, 1942 the Keifuku Electric Railway merged with Mikuni Awara Electric Railway. Operations were halted from April 20, 1944. The station reopened on November 27, 1950, and operations were expanded when the station became a terminus of the Fukui Railway Fukubu Line. On June 25, 2001 the Keifuku Electric Railroad portion of the station closed, and reopened again on  July 20, 2003 as an Echizen Railway station.

Surrounding area
Tawaramachi Station is just to the west of Phoenix-dōri (Prefectural Route 30). Since the University of Fukui's Bunkyō Campus, Hokuriku High School, Fujishima High School and many other educational institutions are located in the vicinity, students are a common sight in mornings and evenings.

Other points of interest include:
 Fukui Tawaramachi Post Office
 Phoenix Plaza
 Fukui Municipal Gymnasium
 Fukui City Library
 Fukui Fine Arts Museum
 Fukui Prefecture Gokoku Shrine

See also
 List of railway stations in Japan

External links

  

Railway stations in Fukui Prefecture
Railway stations in Japan opened in 1928
Mikuni Awara Line
Fukui Railway Fukubu Line
Fukui (city)